Bandhuganj is a village in Jehanabad district of Bihar state, India.

Geography
It is in the Jehanabad district of Bihar, and surrounded by the Falgu river and Chunukpur village to the east, Kako block to the west, Modanganj to the north, and Korma village to the south.

Location
National Highway 110 passes through Bandhuganj.  The nearest airport is Patna Airport. The nearest railway stations are Eknagar Sarai (11 km) and Jehanabad (14 km).  The nearest market is Bandhuganj itself.

Other
It is also known for its watermelon, muskmelon, and desi bhanta.

References

Villages in Jehanabad district